is a Japanese professional shogi player ranked 9-dan. He is a former Kisei title holder and also holds the professional shogi record for being the fastest to win a major title since turning professional..

Early life
Yashiki was born in Sapporo on January 18, 1972. Yashiki obtained the rank of 1-dan in March 1987 and was awarded full professional status and the rank of 4-dan in October 1988.

Shogi professional
Yashiki's first appearance came in November 1989 when he challenged Makoto Nakahara for the 55th Kisei title. Although Yashiki lost the match 3 games to 2, he appearance made him at age 17 years 11 months the youngest player ever to challenge for a major title at that time as well as the fastest, a one year 2 months and eleven days, to do so after being promoted to 4-dan.

Yashiki faced Nakahara once again in the 56th Kisei title match in June 1990. Nakahara won the first two games, but Yashiki came back to win the next three to take the title. Yashiki's victory made him at the age of 18 years 6 months the youngest player to ever win a major title match at that time. Yashiki also set the record for shortest time between turning professional and winning a major title at 1 year 10 months. Later that same year in November, Yashiki successfully defended his title by beating Taku Morishita 3 games to 1 in the 57th Kisei title match, thus making him the youngest player to ever defend a major title. However, Yashiki was unable to defend his title for a second consecutive time in the following June when he lost the 58th Kisei title match to Yoshikazu Minami 3 games to 1.

In 1997, Yashiki defeated Masataka Gōda to advance to the 68th Kisei title match against Hiroyuki Miura. Yashiki defeated Miura 3 games to 1 to recapture the Kisei title. He was, however, unable to defend the title the following year, losing the 69th Kisei title to Gōda 3 games to 0.

In 2001, Yashiki defeated Toshiyuki Moriuchi to advance to the 42nd Ōi match against Yoshiharu Habu, but was defeated 4 games to 0.

On March 18, 2021, Yashiki defeated Chikara Akutsu in a preliminary round game for the 71st Ōshō tournament to become the 23rd professional to win 800 career games.

Promotion history
Yashiki's promotion history is as follows:
 6-kyū: 1985
 1-dan: 1987
 4-dan: October 1, 1988
 5-dan: April 1, 1990
 6-dan: November 25, 1991
 7-dan: March 8, 1996
 8-dan: May 13, 2002
 9-dan: April 1, 2004

Titles and other championships
Yashiki has appeared in major title matches seven times, and he is a three-time winner of the Kisei title. In addition to major titles, Yashiki has won two other shogi championships during his career.

Awards and honors
Yashiki has won a number awards and honors throughout his career for his accomplishments both on an off the shogi board. These include awards given out annually by the JSA for performance in official games as well as other awards for achievement, and other awards given out by governmental organizations, etc. for contributions made to Japanese society.

Annual shogi awards
17th Annual Awards (April 1989March 1990): Best New Player
18th Annual Awards (April 1990March 1991): Fighting-spirit Award
24th Annual Awards (April 1996March 1997): Fighting-spirit Award
25th Annual Awards (April 1997March 1998): Most Consecutive Games Won, Distinguished Service Award

Other awards
1991, January: Hokkaido Prefectural Government's "Eiyo wo Tataete" Award
2009: Shogi Honor Fighting-spirit Award (Awarded by JSA in recognition of winning 600 official games as a professional)

Year-end prize money and game fee ranking
Yashiki has finished in the "Top 10" of the JSA's  three times since 1993: sixth in 1996 with JPY 27,890,000 in earnings, third in 1997 with JPY 35,550,000 in earnings, and fifth in 1998 with JPY 29,370,000 in earnings.

Notes

References

External links
 ShogiHub: Professional Player Info · Yashiki, Nobuyuki

Japanese shogi players
Living people
Professional shogi players
People from Sapporo
Professional shogi players from Hokkaido
Kisei (shogi)
1972 births